Teca Huixquilucan was Mexican football club that played in the Tercera División de México. The club was based in Guadalajara, Jalisco.

Current squad

See also
Football in Mexico

External links
Official Club Page

Football clubs in the State of Mexico
Association football clubs established in 2000
2000 establishments in Mexico